Zerrin Özer (born 4 November 1957) is a Turkish pop singer. She has been called Turkey's Janis Joplin by several fans. She has many famous hits such as "Gönül" (Heart), "Son Mektup" (The Last Letter), "Dayanamıyorum" (I Can't Stand It), "Dünya Tatlısı" (World Sweet), "Paşa Gönlüm" (My Great Heart), "Kıyamam", and "Ah İstanbul".

Biography
She was born in 1957 in Ankara, Turkey. Between 1978 and 1980, she worked with İstanbul Gelişim Orchestra on jazz and dance music projects. In 1980, Özer won a "Golden Album" award with her song "Gönül". In 1982, she performed "Binbir Gece" ("Thousand and one nights") concerts  at the Eiffel Tower in Paris, France. A year later Özer performed in Olympia Hall in Paris. She released "Dayanamıyorum" in 1987 and "Dünya Tatlısı" in 1988. In 1990, Özer married Alper Önal, but they divorced a year later. She won the "Best Album" award once more with her album "İşte Ben" in 1991. Her elder sister Tülay Özer is also a singer and was famous in the 1970s and 1980s. Tülay Özer recorded her last album in 1993.

In 2000, Zerrin Özer released a best-of album titled "Bir Zerrin Özer Arşivi". She married Levent Süren in 2006, but they divorced two years later. In 2006, she published her autobiography Bir Sarışın Küçük Kız. She appeared in "Orhan Gencebay ile Bir Ömür" ("A Life with Orhan Gencebay"), Orhan Gencebay's tribute album, and performed the song "Sev Dedi Gözlerim" ("My Eyes Said Love").

During an operation on her leg a scalpel was left inside her body, and later she underwent another surgery to remove the scalpel, which was unsuccessful and damaged her spinal cord. After using a wheelchair for 1.5 years, she was able to walk again following treatment.

On 16 June 2019, she married Murat Akınca, who is 27 years her junior. After one day, Özer filed for divorce, as Akıncı faced allegations of fraud and connection to Adnan Oktar. Their divorce was finalized on 30 January 2020.

Discography
Albums (LP)

Seni Seviyorum (1980)
Sevgiler (1980)
Ve Zerrin Özer (1981)
Gelecek misin? (1982)
Modern Arabesk (1982)
Mutluluklar Dilerim (1984)
Kırmızı (1985)
Evcilik Oyunu (1985) (Has been released without the permission of the artist.)
Dayanamıyorum (1987)

Albums (CD)

Dünya Tatlısı (1988)
İşte Ben (1990)
Sevildiğini Bil (1991)
Olay Olay (1992)
Zerrin Özer (1996)
Zerrin Özer '97 (1997)
Ölürüm Ben Sana (2003)
Ve Böyle Bir Şey (2005)
Zerrin Özel (2007)
Ömür Geçiyor (2007)
Emanet (2009)

Compilations
Bir Zerrin Özer Arşivi (2000)
Ben (2002) (Has been released without the permission of the artist.)

Singles

"Sizler ve Bizler / Yalvarırım" (1976)
"Gönül / Yaman Olurum" (1979)
"Dünya Tatlısı" (2001)
"Yerin Hazır" (2010)
"Fire" (2010)
"Alim" (2010)
"Giden Gitti" (2012)
"Keşke" (with Ensar Cantürk) (2014)
"Sevda Zindanları" (2014)
"Yağmurlar (with İlker Özdemir)" (2015)
"Zerrin Özer ve Saz Arkadaşları" (2016)
"1 Şarkı 2 Zerrin" (2017)
"Beni Tanıma" (2018)
"Arap Kızı" (with Bohem) (2020)
"Ben Hep Buralardayım" (2021)
"Can Hüseyin" (2022)

See also
List of Turkish musicians
Turkish music

References

External links
 
 
 Who is who database - Biography of Zerrin Özer 
 Diskotek: Bir Diskografi Sitesi - Zerrin Özer Diskografisi 

1957 births
Living people
Musicians from Ankara
Turkish Alevis
Turkish women singers
Turkish pop singers
Turkish folk-pop singers